Alva railway station was a station in the village of Alva, in the Scottish county of Clackmannanshire. The station was the terminus of a branch from Cambus on the Stirling to Dunfermline Lower line.

History
Opened  by the Alva Railway, as part of the North British Railway it became part of the London and North Eastern Railway during the Grouping of 1923, passing on to the Scottish Region of British Railways during the nationalisation of 1948. It was then closed by the British Transport Commission.

The site today
The site, on the south side of the town, has not yet been developed.

References

 
 
 Alva railway closures 

Disused railway stations in Clackmannanshire
Former North British Railway stations
Railway stations in Great Britain opened in 1863
Railway stations in Great Britain closed in 1954
1954 disestablishments in Scotland
1863 establishments in Scotland
Alva, Clackmannanshire